The Eagle Pharmacy Museum is located on the southwest edge of the Bohaterów Getta Square, under number 18 (formerly Maly Rynek, then Plac Zgody) in Kraków, Poland.

Since 1910, its proprietor was Jozef Pankiewicz and after him Tadeusz Pankiewicz (21 November 1908 – 5 November 1993), his son who ran it since 1933. Before World War II, it was one of the four pharmacies in the Podgórze district. Its clients were both Polish and Jewish residents of the district. A frequent customer was, e.g., "Bikkur Cholim" charity.

In March 1941, the Germans established a ghetto in Podgórze for Kraków's Jews, Pankiewicz's pharmacy was the only one within its borders and its proprietor was the only Pole with rights to stay in it. The Germans also decreed that all signs and other public inscriptions in Polish had to be redone in Hebrew throughout the Krakow ghetto. The only exception was the Polish sign over the entranceway to Tadeusz Pankiewicz’s pharmacy, 'Pod Orłem'.

The Jews that lived in the ghetto chose the pharmacy as the place for conspiratorial meetings. Among them were: writer Mordechai Gebirtig, painter Abraham Neumann, Dr. Julian Aleksandrowicz, neurologist Dr. Bernhard Bornstein, Dr Leon Steinberg and pharmacists: Emanuel Herman, Roman Imerglück.
Soon it also became a source of various resources and medicaments, which helped in avoiding deportation: hair dyes used for rejuvenating the appearance, luminal (fenobarbital) used to calm children while hidden, smuggled in luggage beyond the ghetto.

During the bloody displacement at the Plac Zgody in 1942, Pharmacy personnel issued free medicines and dressings while its recesses areas were used as shelters for saving Jews from deportation to extermination camps. During the bloody liquidation of the Krakow ghetto in March 1943, Pankiewicz provided many parents with drugs to help their children sleep while in hiding.

Pankiewicz and his assistants Irena Drozdzikowska, Aurelia Danek and Helena Krywaniuk were liaisons between Jews in the ghetto and beyond it, passing the information and smuggling food. They also were depositaries of valuables entrusted to them by deported Jews in the last moments before leaving the ghetto.

After the War, as  early as 1951 the former pharmacy was nationalized by the Polish state, but Pankiewicz retained a right to use the building until 1955. The pharmacy was finally closed in 1967, and the bar was located here until 1981. Two years later, in 1983 a small historical exhibition was opened in the building while Pankiewicz was still alive, and in 2003, thanks to the donation of the director Roman Polanski, once a prisoner of the Krakow ghetto himself, the museum was expanded.

References

External links 

 The Eagle Pharmacy location

1910 establishments in Poland
Museums in Kraków
History museums in Poland
Defunct pharmacies